Devocalization (also known as ventriculocordectomy or vocal cordectomy, and when performed on a dog debarking or bark softening) is a surgical procedure where tissue is removed from the vocal cords.

Indications and contraindications
Devocalization is usually performed at the request of an animal owner (where the procedure is legally permitted). The procedure may be forcefully requested as a result of a court order. Owners or breeders generally request the procedure because of excessive animal vocalizations, complaining neighbors, or as an alternative to euthanasia due to a court order.

Contraindications include negative reaction to anesthesia, infection, bleeding, and pain. There is also the possibility that the removed tissue will grow back, or of scar tissue blocking the throatboth cases requiring further surgeriesthough with the incisional technique the risk of fibrosis is virtually eliminated.

Effectiveness
The devocalization procedure does not take away a dog's ability to bark. Dogs will normally bark just as much as before the procedure. After the procedure, the sound will be softer, typically about half as loud as before, or less, and it is not as sharp or piercing. So while the procedure does not stop barking or silence the animal completely, it is effective in reducing the sound level and sharpness of the dog's bark.

Most devocalized dogs have a subdued "husky" bark, audible up to 20 metres.

Procedure
The surgery may be performed via the animal's mouth, with a portion of the vocal folds removed using a biopsy punch, cautery tool, scissor, or laser. The procedure may also be performed via an incision in the throat and through the larynx, which is a more invasive technique. All devocalization procedures require general anesthesia.

Reasons for excessive vocalization
Chronic, excessive vocalization may be due to improper socialization or training, stress, boredom, fear, or frustration. Up to 35% of dog owners report problems with barking, which can cause disputes and legal problems. The behavior is more common among some breeds of dog, such as the Shetland Sheepdog, which are known as loud barkers, due to the nature of the environment in which the breed was developed.

Less invasive interventions
Vocalizations are a natural behavior of animals which they use widely in intra-specific and inter-specific communication. As such, devocalization should generally be considered only as a last resort. Before this surgical intervention, there are other, less invasive interventions which can be considered to overcome excessive vocalizations.

Training
Training can be one of the most effective techniques to help combat excessive barking in dogs. Acquiring the help of a professional dog trainer can often help reduce an animal's barking.

Corrective collars
The use of automatic and manual corrective collars can be useful as a training aid when used correctly; however, the use of corrective collars, particularly shock collars, is controversial and banned in some countries. Types of corrective collars include vibration, citronella spray, ultrasonic and electrostatic/shock collar.

Accommodation
Because dogs often bark excessively due to stress, boredom, or frustration, changing aspects of an animal's environment to make them more content is a suitable way to quiet them down, rather than forcibly silencing a distressed animal. Spending more time with an animal, such as playing, walking, and other bonding activities, will keep them occupied and make them feel more at ease. If the animal is stressed, it is best to remove the object that is causing them discomfort.

Controversy and legislation

Reasons opposing
In some regions of the US and in the UK, convenience devocalization is considered a form of surgical mutilation.
Most veterinarians and the RSPCA offer information to behavioral schools on how to train dogs not to bark.

Reasons favoring
Several reasons are offered in favor of devocalization.
Dogs are allowed to bark freely, their natural behavior.
The animal is no longer subject to constant disapproval (discipline).
Animals that previously had to be kept indoors can be allowed outdoors again.

Further, breeds and individual animals known for excessive barking/vocalizing have a higher chance of being adopted/rescued and not being repeatedly re-homed if/when training fails.

Context
Dr. Kathy Gaughan points out that "the surgery stops the barking, but it doesn't address why the dog was barking in the first place." Gaughan notes that visitors to her clinic who request debarking are usually looking for a "quick fix". Gaughan states that, commonly, those who seek debarking live in apartments, or have neighbors who complain. Gaughan also counts "breeders with many dogs" among those who most often seek convenience devocalization. However, Dr. Gaughan does not agree with those who claim the procedure is cruel, stating: "Recently, some animal advocates have asserted this surgery is cruel to the animal; some countries have even outlawed the procedure. I do not believe the surgical procedure is cruel; however, failing to address the underlying factors is inappropriate."

Some breeders seek the surgery in order to limit or diminish noise levels for personal reasons ranging from convenience to prevention; some breeders even seek the surgery for puppies prior to going to new homes.

Opinions of animal welfare societies
Multiple animal medicine and animal welfare organizations discourage the use of convenience devocalization, recommending that it be used only as a last resort. However, organizations such as the American Veterinary Medical Association, American Animal Hospital Association and the American Society for the Prevention of Cruelty to Animals, oppose laws that would make devocalization illegal.

The American Veterinary Medical Association's official position is that "canine devocalization should be performed only by qualified, licensed veterinarians as a final alternative after behavioral modification efforts to correct excessive vocalization have failed."

The AVMA's position was later adopted by the American Animal Hospital Association.

The Canadian Veterinary Medical Association's position statement on devocalization of dogs states: "The Canadian Veterinary Medical Association (CVMA) discourages 'devocalization' of dogs unless it is the only alternative to euthanasia, and humane treatment and management methods have failed."

The American Society for the Prevention of Cruelty to Animals (ASPCA) recommends that animal caretakers first attempt to address animal behavior problems with humane behavior modification techniques and/or with a treatment protocol set up by an animal behavior specialist. The ASPCA recommends surgery only if behavior modification techniques have failed, and the animal is at risk of losing its home or its life.

Legal restriction and banning
The legality of convenience devocalization varies by jurisdiction.

The procedure is outlawed as a form of mutilation in the United Kingdom and all countries that have signed the European Convention for the Protection of Pet Animals. In the United States, devocalization is illegal in Massachusetts, New Jersey, and Warwick, Rhode Island.

United Kingdom
Debarking is specifically prohibited in the UK, along with ear cropping, tail docking, and declawing (cats too). By law, convenience devocalization is considered a form of surgical mutilation.

United States
In the United States, laws vary by state. In 2000, anti-debarking legislation was proposed in California, New Jersey, and Ohio. The California and New Jersey bills failed, partially due to opposition from groups who predicted the ban would lead to similar bans on ear cropping and other controversial cosmetic surgical procedures on dogs. The Ohio bill survived, and was signed into law by Governor Robert Taft in August 2000. However, Ohio Revised Code 955.22 outlawed debarking only of dogs considered "vicious".

In February 2009, 15-year-old Jordan Star of Needham, Massachusetts, filed a bill to outlaw performing convenience devocalization procedures upon cats and dogs. The bill was co-sponsored by Senator Scott Brown, with the title Logan's Law, after a debarked sheepdog. Star said of convenience devocalization: "To take a voice away from an animal is morally wrong." The bill became state law on April 23, 2010. 

Devocalizing cats and dogs also became illegal in Warwick, Rhode Island, by city ordinance in 2011. Legislation to ban devocalization of dogs and cats in New York State is pending.

See also
Barking
Debarking
Disembarkation
Overview of discretionary invasive procedures on animals

References

External links

"Debarking (Bark Softening) – Myths and Facts"
"Debarking Dogs: Bark Softening Surgery" 

Dog health
Dog anatomy
Animal welfare
Animal rights
Animals and humans